Matthew Richard Scott is an English politician, and the current Police and Crime Commissioner for Kent, representing the Conservative Party. He was elected to the post on 5 May 2016 and re-elected in 2021. Before his election to the role of police and crime commissioner he worked for Conservative MP David Evennett as his office manager, and served as a councillor in Bexley from 2006 to 2010. Scott, whose father and brother have both been serving police officers, was chosen as Kent Conservatives' PCC candidate in October 2015.

References

Year of birth missing (living people)
Living people
Police and crime commissioners in England
Conservative Party (UK) politicians